"Strawberry Moon" (stylized in all lowercase) is a song by South Korean singer-songwriter IU. It was released on October 19, 2021, through EDAM Entertainment via Kakao M. "Strawberry Moon" was both written and composed by IU, with additional composition credits by Jonghoon Lee and Lee Chae-gyu.

Background and composition
IU's agency EDAM Entertainment unveiled the first teaser for "Strawberry Moon" on October 5, 2021, showing her in a dream-like setting sitting atop a giant ice cream scoop, with its release date set for October 19. She subsequently released a series of teasers, with a lyric teaser for its accompanying music video posted to YouTube on October 15. The song was made available for digital download and streaming at midnight local time four days later, and serves as a followup to her fifth studio-album Lilac, which was released seven months prior. The track was both written and composed by IU, with additional production credits by Jonghoon Lee and Lee Chae-gyu.

"Strawberry Moon"s composition has been described as that reminiscent of a fairy tale, with its soft piano melody and IU's delicate voice. The lyrics of the song's chorus conveys the feelings of warm comfort in a romantic relationship, with its lyrics translating to: "Scoop of a large strawberry moon / I will entrust you to me eh-oh / The feeling of flying so cool / How is life more perfect ooh". Tamar Herman of South China Morning Post also described "Strawberry Moon" as a "breezy electropop-rock" track that talks about "a fated meeting" and equates it to a scoop of strawberry ice.

Critical reception

Tanu I. Raj of NME said the song is a depiction of "the kind of easy, mature love that is unaffected by the whimsies of the heart or life" and praised IU's lyricism. She noted how the "lightness of being" becomes a "visual, sonic and lyrical theme" throughout the track and how the instrumental emphasizes the lyrics: while IU sings "feeling like floating up/Through the tense darkness/We won't be afraid" the piano "segues into atmospheric beats on the pre-chorus, as if with every word, she defies gravity and reaches a little higher", scene perfectly portrayed in the music video, where IU and her partner drive up in the sky. Tamar Herman of South China Morning Post said the track is "the perfect sonic representation of who she is and where she is in her career" and she included it on her list of Best K-pop releases of October 2021. Junhwan Jang of IZM said the song is "a triumph of lyrics" with "unique metaphors" and praised IU's lyricism, saying it "fully showed off in a song" since "Love Poem".

Music video
The music video was posted to YouTube in conjunction with the release of the digital single. The visual was directed by Flipevil, who also worked with IU on the video for "Lilac" in March. Lee Jong-won appears as IU's opposite in the video.

Accolades 
"Strawberry Moon" achieved a triple crown on the music program Inkigayo, in addition to a quintuple crown on Show! Music Core.

Charts

Weekly charts

Monthly charts

Year-end charts

Certifications

Release history

References

2021 singles
2021 songs
Gaon Digital Chart number-one singles
IU (singer) songs
Songs written by IU (singer)
Korean-language songs
Kakao M singles
Billboard Korea K-Pop number-one singles